The Suzuki GSX-R600 is a 600 cc  supersport, sport bike in Suzuki's GSX-R series of motorcycles.

History 

1992–1993
Launched with a water-cooled  inline-4 engine. The first model had the same body specifications as the 1992 GSX-R750, with the smaller engine and carried over through to the 1993 model year with no changes. It was not imported to UK.

1994–1996
Not produced.

1997–2000
Redesigned with the introduction of Suzuki Ram Air Direct (SRAD) and carried over through to the 2000 model year.

2001–2003
Redesigned with the introduction of fuel injection and carried over through to the 2003 model year with very few changes.

2004–2005
Redesigned which carried over through to the 2005 model year.
Total redesign of the fairings and fuel tank. Inverted forks with radial-mounted brakes. Titanium valves, 32-bit ECU were some of the changes on the engine side.

2006–2007
Suzuki introduced an all-new GSX-R600. Underslung exhaust and slipper clutch introduced.
Engine is completely new, but with the same bore and stroke as before.

2008–2010
New subframe, bodywork, and fuel tank. Introduction of new Suzuki Drive Mode Selector (S-DMS).

2011–2020
9 kg Lighter overall, Showa Big Piston Forks (BPF), Brembo monobloc radial front brake calipers, re-designed lighter frame and swingarm, 15 mm shorter wheelbase. New gauge cluster similar to that used on the GSX-R1000. New cams, lighter pistons, higher compression and pentagonal ventilation holes on the block increases mid-range torque.

Specifications

References

External links 
 

GSX-R600
Suzuki GSX-R600
Motorcycles introduced in 1992

it:Suzuki GSX-R#GSX-R 600